The Martin Cramer House, located near Stevensville, Montana, was built in 1893. It was listed on the National Register of Historic Places in 1987.

The house is a two-story L-shaped eclectic-styled house with a mansard roof.  It includes details from Second Empire architecture and Stick/Eastlake architecture.  It was built by local carpenters Erick Erickson and John Lagerquist and "exhibits a high level of craftsmanship and material integrity".

References

Houses on the National Register of Historic Places in Montana
Second Empire architecture in Montana
Queen Anne architecture in Montana
Houses completed in 1893
Houses in Ravalli County, Montana
National Register of Historic Places in Ravalli County, Montana
1893 establishments in Montana